The election for Resident Commissioner to the United States House of Representatives took place on November 8, 1932, the same day as the larger Puerto Rican general election and the United States elections, 1932.

Candidates for Resident Commissioner
 Benigno Fernández García for the Liberal Party
 Julio Medina González for the Nationalist Party
 Santiago Iglesias Pantín for the Republican Union

Election results

See also 
Puerto Rican general election, 1932

References 

Puerto Rico
1932